Pancoast is an unincorporated community in Jefferson County, in the U.S. state of Pennsylvania.

History
A post office was established at Pancoast in 1876, and remained in operation until 1899. The former mining community once contained the Pancoast Mine, employing at least 36 miners.

References

Unincorporated communities in Jefferson County, Pennsylvania
Unincorporated communities in Pennsylvania